James Arthur Turman Sr. (November 29, 1927 – February 13, 2019) was an American politician and educator.

He served as a Democratic member in the Texas House of Representatives from 1955 to 1963. In 1961, he served as Speaker of the Texas House of Representatives.

Early life 
Turman served in the United States Navy. He went to Texas A&M University–Commerce and University of Texas. Turman was a junior high school principal.

References

1927 births
2019 deaths
Democratic Party members of the Texas House of Representatives
People from Leonard, Texas
Military personnel from Texas
Educators from Texas
Texas A&M University–Commerce alumni
University of Texas alumni
Deaths from cerebrovascular disease